Hayley Smith (born 1965) is an American sculptor. Smith is known for her intricate and detailed wood turning works.

Early life
Smith was born in Cardiff, Wales in 1965. She studied both design and art education in Cardiff. She discovered wood turning by accident when, during her second  year of university, she was assigned a woodshop project and the lathe was the only tool not being used.

Work
Her work is included in the collections of the Smithsonian American Art Museum, the Minneapolis Institute of Art, the Yale University Art Gallery the Victoria & Albert Museum, the Center for Art in  Wood and the Los Angeles County Museum of Art.

References

1965 births
21st-century American women artists
Living people
20th-century American women artists
American women sculptors